Riepetown is a ghost town in White Pine County, Nevada, United States. Riepetown is located on former State Route 485, 3 miles southwest of its junction with U.S. Route 50; 5 miles northwest of Ely.

History
Riepetown was named for Richard A. Riepe, a first-generation German immigrant who surveyed the land in this area. Riepe was later elected to the Nevada Assembly, representing Lincoln County in 1883 and White Pine County in 1889.

Riepetown was not a company town and thus played host to businesses banned in other mining communities, such as brothels and saloons. It was decimated by a massive fire in 1917, and though portions were rebuilt, the town gradually depopulated.

Notes

Unincorporated communities in Nevada
Unincorporated communities in White Pine County, Nevada
Great Basin National Heritage Area